Yukihiro Mitani (born 22 April 1966) is a Japanese speed skater. He competed in the men's 1000 metres event at the 1988 Winter Olympics.

References

External links
 
 
 

1966 births
Living people
Japanese male speed skaters
Olympic speed skaters of Japan
Speed skaters at the 1988 Winter Olympics
Asian Games gold medalists for Japan
Asian Games medalists in speed skating
Speed skaters at the 1986 Asian Winter Games
Medalists at the 1986 Asian Winter Games
World Sprint Speed Skating Championships medalists
Sportspeople from Hokkaido